Carlos Sebastián Lentinelly Villavicencio (born 7 August 1997) is a Uruguayan professional footballer who plays as a goalkeeper for Liverpool Montevideo.

Career statistics

Club

References

External links
Profile at Football Database

1997 births
Living people
Uruguayan footballers
Liverpool F.C. (Montevideo) players
Uruguayan Primera División players
Association football goalkeepers
Footballers from Salto, Uruguay